Alexey Alexandrovich Mordashov (born 26 September 1965) is a Russian billionaire businessman. He is the main shareholder and chairman of Severstal, Russia's largest steel and mining company.

As of March 2022, Bloomberg Billionaires Index estimated Mordashov's personal net worth at US$21.2 billion, making him the second-richest person in Russia. In the Forbes ranking, which takes into account the assets of the whole family, Mordashov ranks first among Russian billionaires ($29.1B).

When he was 37, Forbes ordained him (along with Oprah) as a "new arrival" in the world of billionaires.

Mordashov was mentioned in the Panama Papers and FinCEN files leaks – a company associated with Mordashov paid for a number of Vladimir Putin's pet projects and gave generously to close Putin associates.

He is under sanctions due to Russia's 2022 invasion of Ukraine. According to the EU, Rossiya Bank, which Mordashov owns a financial stake in, is the "personal bank" of the senior officials who benefitted from the annexation of Crimea.

Early life
Mordashov is the son of Russian parents, who were both steel mill workers. According to Mordashov, his family used welfare coupons, allowed only 200g of butter and 400g of sausages per month. He graduated with a bachelor's degree from the Leningrad Engineering-Economical Institute, currently known as ENGECON. He later gained an MBA from Northumbria University in Newcastle upon Tyne, England, in 2001. In an address to students at the European University at Saint Petersburg, Mordashov spoke about his decision to study in Leningrad rather than Moscow and the value his undergraduate studies played in his search for employment and eventual career path. Returning to Cherepovets, he started his career by joining the same steel plant where his parents had worked.

Career

Early career 
In 1988 he joined Cherepovetskiy Metallurgical Plant after graduation from Leningrad Engineering-Economical Institut as an economist. By 1992 he became finance director, shortly before the company was privatised. When the plant's elderly director instructed him to acquire shares to keep them out of the hands of an outsider, he formed two investment funds and, by buying up workers' shares, built a major stake in the factory. In 1996 he was appointed as CEO of the company. He went on to build a conglomerate, Severstal, acquiring steel, coal and mining companies.

Investments 
In 2003, Mordashov became a co-owner of Rossiya Bank.

In 2004, Mordashov started investing in US steel companies, purchasing companies in Dearborn, MI and Columbus, MS. The acquisition included the Rouge Plant in Dearborn. He received a loan from the United States Department of Energy to renovate and refurbish the manufacturing plants in Dearborn. The value of the loan, over $370 million, was revoked in 2012, after growing political tensions between the US and Russia.

Between 2004 and 2014, Mordashov and Severstal invested up to $3 billion in both the Dearborn and Columbus plants. In 2011 he sold a number of US assets in Ohio, Maryland and West Virginia to the Renco Group, owned by industrialist Ira Rennert. By 2014 all of Severstal's US investments had been sold for a total of $2.3 billion.

His company Severstal planned a multibillion-dollar project in joint venture with POSCO in eastern India. After ten years of not getting environmental and land clearances, his company opted out in 2008.

In autumn 2007, Mordashov purchased shares in TUI Travel. As he increased his stake to the largest single shareholder through his S-Group Travel, TUI Travel under Michael Frenzel expanded into Eastern Europe and Russia in 2008, China and India in 2009, and sold off its shipping interests, Hapag-Lloyd AG, to the Albert Ballin Consortium in March 2009. In 2014, he held a blocking stake of more than 25% in TUI Travel when TUI Travel was absorbed by TUI Group. In October 2018, he has a 24.9% stake in TUI Group through his S-Group Travel and has been on the TUI Group supervisory board since 2016.

In 2008, Mordashov, Surgutneftegas and Rossiya Bank created the National Media Group, which now owns packages in TV channels (Fifth, First, REN TV)

In 2011, Mordashov purchased 25% of the shares in steam turbine manufacturer, Power Machines, from Siemens. In 2013, with partner Yuri Kovalchuk, Mordashov bought 50% of Tele2 Russia, the country's 4th largest mobile phone operator.

In 2012, Mordashov consolidated Severstal's gold mining assets into one company,  Nord Gold N.V. The company was listed on the London Stock Exchange (LSE: NORD LI). In 2013, Nord Gold was awarded a license to embark on gold exploration in Siberia. In 2017 Mordashov announced plans to delist Nordgold  from the London Stock Exchange (LSE)  citing unfair valuation as the reason. The LSE requires that companies have at least 25% as free float, while Mordashov owns 91% of the company.

Mordashov was elected as chairman of the World Steel Association in October 2012. In 2011, he was the only Russian participant in a meeting of Bilderberg Club at St Moritz, Switzerland.

In June 2013, Mordashov was the fifth largest shareholder of Rossiya Bank owning 6%.

In 2015, Mordashov stepped down as CEO, appointing former COO Vadim Larin, in his place. Mordashov would be appointed as chairman. The changes were confirmed by Severstal.

On 10 October 2017 Alexey Mordashov became a Commander of the Order of Merit of the Grand Duchy of Luxembourg.

Recent 

On 28 February 2022, in relation to the 2022 Russian invasion of Ukraine, the European Union blacklisted Mordashov and had all his assets frozen. In early March, the Italian police seized one of his yachts, the Lady M. At that time, another one of his yachts, the Nord, was outside the European Unions jurisdiction in the Seychelles.

Pandora Papers 

The Pandora Papers were a collection of nearly 12 million leaked confidential financial records compiled by the International Consortium of Investigative Journalists. Within those records are details of how a special unit known as "Cypriot" within accounting firm PricewaterhouseCoopers (PwC) helped Mordashov "build the offshore infrastructure of his business empire." The firm helped set up over 65 shell companies in various "secrecy jurisdictions" such as the British Virgin Islands on behalf of a holding company connected to Mordashov. Through these shell companies, Mordashov expanded his presence in the logging, coal, and media industries inside Russia.

Personal life 
Mordashov and his first wife Elena (sometimes Yelena) have a son, Ilya, and divorced in 1996. In 2001, it was revealed in a St Petersburg divorce court that he was paying only $620 a month to support his ex-wife and son, when she sued him for half of his pre-divorce property but lost the case and incurred large fees. The case was eventually settled after she took it to the European Court of Human Rights.

Mordashov owns the yachts Lady M and Nord as well as a private jet.

By 2001, Mordashov had married his second wife, also Elena, and had had two more sons - Kirill and Nikita.

In 2018-2019, for Kirill and Nikita the KN-holding company was created, to which Mordashov transferred his shares in Nordgold and TUI. In this way, the businessman hoped to transfer business experience to his sons. But in 2021, Nikita lost his share due to unsuccessful studies and leaving for military service.

In 2022, the ICIJ reported that Mordashov transferred most of his ownership stake in tourism conglomerate TUI to a Caribbean shell company controlled by Marina Mordashova who is reportedly the mother of some of his children.

See also
List of Russian billionaires

References

1965 births
Living people
People from Cherepovets
Alumni of Northumbria University
Businesspeople in steel
Russian billionaires
Russian mining businesspeople
Russian individuals subject to European Union sanctions
Russian activists against the 2022 Russian invasion of Ukraine